The Emirate of Afghanistan, known as the Emirate of Kabul until 1855, was an emirate in Central Asia and South Asia that encompassed present-day Afghanistan and parts of present-day Pakistan (before 1893). The emirate emerged from the Durrani Empire, when Dost Mohammad Khan, the founder of the Barakzai dynasty in Kabul, prevailed.

The history of the Emirate was dominated by the 'Great Game' between the Russian Empire and the United Kingdom for supremacy in Central Asia. This period was characterized by European influence in Afghanistan. The Emirate of Afghanistan continued the Durrani Empire's war with the Sikh Empire, losing control of the former Afghan stronghold of the Valley of Peshawar at the Battle of Nowshera on 14 March 1823. This was followed in 1839 by the First Anglo-Afghan War with British forces. The war eventually resulted in victory for Afghans, with the British withdrawal and Dost Mohammad being reinstalled to the throne. However, during the Second Anglo-Afghan War (1878-1880), the British and Afghans signed the Treaty of Gandamak, which allowed the British to assume control of the Afghan territories within modern-day Pakistan as well as of Afghanistan's foreign affairs, on the condition that a subsidy be paid to the Afghans and the British military fully withdraw. Emir Amanullah Khan signed the Anglo-Afghan Treaty of 1919 following the Third Anglo-Afghan War, gaining full Afghan independence. In 1926, Amanullah Khan reformed the country as the Kingdom of Afghanistan, becoming its first King.

History
Escalated a few years after the establishment of the emirate, the Russian and British interests were in conflict between Muhammad Shah of Iran and Dost Mohammad Khan, which led to the First Anglo-Afghan War, fought between 1839 and 1842. During the war, Britain occupied the capital, Kabul, of the then called Emirate of Kabulistan, in an effort to prevent Afghanistan from coming under Russian control and curb Russian expansion, while also keeping Afghanistan in the British fold under a puppet leader, Shah Shujah Durrani. The war ended with Dost Mohammad returning to the throne, with the British withdrawing; unable to subjugate the country, they forged greater ties instead, allowing Dost Mohammad to move toward uniting the dis-united state of Afghanistan, which split from the Durrani Civil wars brought on by the sons of Timur Shah.

Upon the death of Dost Mohammad in 1863, he was succeeded by his son, Sher Ali Khan. However, three years later, his older brother Mohammad Afzal Khan overthrew him. In 1868, Mohammad Afzal Khan was himself overthrown and replaced as Emir by Sher Ali, who returned to the throne after spending few short years in exile in Russia. His return as Emir led to new conflicts with Britain. Subsequently, the British marched on 21 November 1878 into Afghanistan and Emir Sher Ali was forced to flee again to Russia, but he died in 1879 in Mazar-i-Sharif. His successor, Mohammad Yaqub Khan, sought solutions for peace with Russia and gave them a greater say in Afghanistan's foreign policy. Meanwhile, he signed the Treaty of Gandamak with the British on 26 May 1879, relinquishing solely the control of Afghanistan foreign affairs to the British Empire. However, when the British envoy Sir Louis Cavagnari was killed in Kabul on 3 September 1879, the British offered to accept Abdur Rahman Khan as Emir. The British concluded a peace treaty with the Afghans in 1880, and withdrew again in 1881 from Afghanistan. The British, in 1893, forced Afghanistan to consent to a new border, termed the Durand Line, which cuts right through the historic Pashtun settlement region, leading to British India annexing roughly a third of what had been Afghanistan.

After the war, Emir Abdur Rahman Khan, who struck down the country reformed and repressed numerous uprisings. After his death in 1901 his son Habibullah Khan succeeded as emir and continued reforms. Habibullah Khan sought reconciliation with the UK, where he graduated in 1905 with a peace treaty with Russia, stretching for defeat in the Russo-Japanese War had to withdraw from Afghanistan. In the First World War, Afghanistan remained neutral, despite German and Ottoman efforts (Niedermayer–Hentig Expedition). In 1919 Habibullah Khan was assassinated by political opponents.

Habibullah Khan's son Amanullah Khan was in 1919 against the rightful heir apparent Nasrullah Khan, the then Emir of Afghanistan. Shortly afterwards another war broke which lasted for three months. This war was ended with the Anglo-Afghan Treaty of 1919 after which, the Afghans were able to resume the right to conduct their own foreign affairs as a fully independent state. Amanullah Khan began the reformation of the country and was crowned 1926 Padshah (king) of Afghanistan and founded the Kingdom of Afghanistan.

See also
 Durrani dynasty
 Barakzai dynasty
 Afghanistan–United Kingdom relations
 European influence in Afghanistan
 Invasions of Afghanistan

Notes

References

Citations

Works cited

Further reading
 Clements, Frank. Conflict in Afghanistan: A Historical Encyclopedia (ABC-Clio, 2003), (online).

 
Emirate of Afghanistan
Emirate of Afghanistan
Former countries in South Asia
Former countries in Central Asia
Former emirates
Emirate of Afghanistan
Emirate of Afghanistan
Emirate of Afghanistan
Emirate of Afghanistan
Emirate of Afghanistan
Emirate of Afghanistan
Former countries of the interwar period
History of Khyber Pakhtunkhwa